In science fiction, a shrink ray is any device which uses energy to reduce the physical size of matter. Many are also capable of enlarging items as well. A growth ray typically only has the ability to enlarge.

Scientific 
Science fiction writer and polymath Isaac Asimov wrote: Miniaturization doesn't actually make sense unless you miniaturize the very atoms which build up matter. Otherwise a tiny brain in a human the size of an insect, composed of normal atoms, is composed of too few atoms for the miniaturized human to be any more intelligent than the insect.  Also, miniaturizing atoms is impossible according to the rules of quantum mechanics.

Depending on how those atoms were supposed to have been miniaturized, a miniature human may or may not weigh as much as they originally did, which is an observation that has been used for various effects over the years in fictions such as comic books.

However, the problems of a miniature human don't stop there. Basic geometry governs parameters such as relationships between cross-sectional area, volume, and surface area. It may be impossible for a one-inch high human to kill themselves in a fall of any conceivable height, but they may be able to drown themselves with a single drop of water.

Appearances in popular culture

Films and television
Dr. Cyclops from the 1940 horror film of that name shrank his victims by locking them inside an "atomic generator".
 In the 1958 movie Attack of the Puppet People, a scientist captures people and shrinks them to 6 inches in height with an ultrasonic wave device, so he can keep them as company. (He keeps them sealed inside special suspended animation canisters between "puppet shows".)
The 1966 science-fiction film Fantastic Voyage (written by Harry Kleiner, novelization by Isaac Asimov) is plotted around such a device, allowing the miniaturized submarine Proteus to carry a crew inside a stricken scientist in an attempt to save his life. They have one hour to cure him before they expand back to normal size.
In the episode "The Big Break-In" of the 1987 Teenage Mutant Ninja Turtles animated TV series, Krang uses a remote-controlled minimizer device with a shrink ray to shrink down US Army bases, preventing them from attacking the Technodrome. In the episode "Funny, They Shrunk Michelangelo" of the same TV series captain Talbot Breech uses a miniaturizing ray to shrink US naval ships and put them into bottles as revenge on those who turned him down for the US Naval Academy. The same show also features the episode "Poor Little Rich Turtle" features Shredder using a shrink ray on the girl Buffy Shellhammer, who despite her young age runs a company, to force her telling a super rocket fuel formula her grandfather told her before he died.
In The Penguins of Madagascar episode "Jiggles", Kowalski uses his shrink ray to shrink Jiggles to normal size.
In an episode "Getting Antsy" of the 1991 Darkwing Duck cartoon, a villain Lilliput uses the ray to shrink buildings and landmarks of the fictional city St. Canard. He then employs ants to haul the shrunken buildings to a miniature golf, where they become part of the course. Eventually, Lilliput also shrinks the hero Darkwing Duck to an even tinier size.
In an episode of Codename: Kids Next Door, titled Operation: M.I.N.I.G.O.L.F., after Numbuh 2 bests champion golfer, Rupert Putkin, in a game of mini-golf, Rupert seeks revenge. He builds a shrink ray to shrink down the world's greatest monuments and uses them in his own miniature-golf course. Afterwards, he shrinks Numbuh 2 and forces him to play a rematch in his smaller height. Later, Rupert plans to use Numbuh 2 as the golfball as he hits him into a hole that will activate his shrink ray to shrink the world. His plan fails when he misses and Numbuh 2 hits the reverse setting on the shrink ray, which zaps Rupert and makes him grow bigger, causing him to step on and crush his golf course. The shrink ray is destroyed subsequently, but Numbuh 2 remains tiny. He runs back to his friends in the treehouse, and they use him for ping-pong.
In another episode of Kids Next Door, entitled "Operation: S.P.R.O.U.T.", when Numbuh 4 swallows a Brussels sprout, supposedly to make him an adult faster, his friends at Sector V take action. Numbuhs 1, 2, and 5 use a shrink ray to shrink down to the size of a booger. Afterwards, Numbuh 3 places them inside of Numbuh 4's nose, and they make their way to the stomach to recover the Brussels sprout, before the shrink effect wears off. They are able to retrieve the massive sprout and make it out of Numbuh 4's body just before they re-expand to normal size. In the aftermath, Numbuh 4 returns home and accidentally eats liver, implying that they have to go on the same mission again.
In the TV series, The Adventures of Jimmy Neutron: Boy Genius, one of Jimmy's most-used inventions is his shrink ray, first introduced in his film in which he shrank himself in order to sneak out of his house.
In the 1996 Tim Burton's movie, Mars Attacks, the Martian Leader uses a shrinking ray to shrink and crush the President of the United States' main general, General Decker.
In "In the Belly of the Boss", the third segment of The Simpsons Halloween special episode "Treehouse of Horror XV", the Simpson family is shrunk by Professor Frink.
A shrink ray invented by Professor Wayne Szalinski is featured throughout the Honey, I Shrunk the Kids franchise, and is the primary invention used throughout. Not only could it shrink people or other objects, but it could also reverse the effect to bring them back to normal size.
In a 1995 episode of Captain Planet and the Planeteers called "No Small Problem", Dr. Blight invents a shrinking ray which Sly Sludge uses to shrink rubbish.
In an episode of Home Improvement, Tim and Al shrink themselves using shrink rays to work deep inside of the engine.
In Doctor Who, the Master uses a Tissue Compression Eliminator to shrink and kill people.
The Lilo & Stitch franchise has featured several instances of shrink rays:
In Lilo & Stitch: The Series, Dr. Jumba Jookiba has a "reducer ray" that can shrink objects. This device is used in "Poxy" to shrink Lilo and Stitch in the X-Buggy to get into Pleakley to retrieve a microscopic experiment (Experiment 222/Poxy) that makes people ill. Gantu is also shrunk down by the same device in the episode. In "Short Stuff", a different device called the "Protoplasmic Growth Ray" is used to enlarge Stitch to become big enough to ride a roller coaster, but he's accidentally made gigantic and thus too big to ride the coaster. The episode's experiment (Experiment 297/Shortstuff) is also enlarged by the device, getting into a fight and winning against Stitch (who was enlarged even further to try to defeat him) at the fair. Stitch is brought back to his regular size to defeat the experiment. Gantu also used the device to enlarge Experiment 625 to get him to crush Lilo, Stitch, Jumba, and Pleakley, but 625 shows no interest in them and instead uses his enlarged size to eat the world's largest sandwich.
Two episodes of the anime spin-off series Stitch! feature Experiment 001/Shrink, an experiment first introduced in the Lilo & Stitch: The Series finale film Leroy & Stitch (as a cameo) as a rare example of a living creature (albeit an artificial lifeform) being a shrink ray. In the episode "Shrink", the experiment shrinks several characters to a smaller size until he returns them to their regular sizes, although at the end of the episode he instead grows the alien insect BooGoo to become larger than the planet Earth. In "Experiment-a-palooza", Shrink grows Stitch into a giant; the latter goes on a rampage—as he has also reverted to his former destructive programming thanks to the abilities of Experiment 210/Retro—until Yuna manages to calm him down.
In the Aqua Teen Hunger Force episode "Unremarkable Voyage", Frylock builds a shrink ray (which can also enlarge items). Master Shake quickly gains control of the machine and proceeds to abuse its power for his own benefit. The shrink ray turns out to be faulty, however, as shrunken items return to normal size after a period of time.
A shrink ray is a recurring device shown in Venture Brothers, although it never seems to actually work properly.
In Despicable Me, Gru used the shrink ray to shrink the Moon and pocket it. The effects of the shrink ray are only temporary, however, and the bigger the mass of an object, the quicker the effect wears off; this is called the "Nefario Principle". Vector returns the Moon to satellite orbit before it returns to normal size using his escape pod, but the Moon expands before he could do so in time and his escape pod is consequently destroyed, trapping him and a Minion on the now normal-sized Moon.
In Innerspace, a naval aviator is selected as a guinea pig to participate in a project which places him in a submersible pod to be shrunk to microscopic size and injected into the body of a rabbit.
In Gravity Falls, Dipper Pines was insulted by his twin Mabel Pines, so he finds a crystal that he attaches to a flashlight. One side enlarges things and the other shrinks things. It falls into Gideon's hands until the twins stop Gideon from shrinking Grunkle Stan and taking the Mystery Shack.
In Dragon Ball, a Micro Band invented by Bulma can shrink its wearer. Also, a portable home called a Capsule House can be carried around in a capsule and deployed when desired.
In the episode "The Sound of Fear" from the Monsters vs. Aliens TV series, Dr. Crockroach uses a shrink gun to shrink Susan. After a few minutes, she is back to normal.
 In an episode of Phineas and Ferb, Dr. Doofinshmirtz shrinks himself but misses his hand. Phineas and Ferb have also shrunk themselves twice.
 In the Barbie: Life in the Dreamhouse episode entitled "The Shrinkerator", Ken builds a shrink ray and accidentally shrinks Barbie and Raquelle.
 In the WordGirl episode entitled "Shrinkin' in the Ray", Dr. Too-Brains uses a shrink ray to shrink cheese and shrunk Scoops and WordGirl.
 In The Electric Company episode "Shrink, Shrank, Shrunk", Manny uses a "shrinkinator" to shrink the water bottle and the car but accidentally shrinks Jessica, Marcus, and himself instead. In the end, they return to normal size.
 In the sixth season of Archer, episodes "Drastic Voyage: Part I" and "Drastic Voyage: Part II" involve a CIA-developed machine which can perform "molecular miniaturization" and which is essentially a shrink ray. The episodes both parody and reference Fantastic Voyage.
 In Mickey Mouse episode called "Down the Hatch", Mickey and Goofy get trapped inside Donald's body after they accidentally get shrunken down from a shrink ray to miniature proportions.
 In the episode "Incredible Shrinking Cat" from The Tom and Jerry Comedy Show, Tom and Jerry end up in a scientist's laboratory where they discover a shrink and growth ray, which is used on Tom.

Radio
 The "Pertwee System of Infinite Acceleration" in the Dimension X episode "The Professor Was a Thief" was a shrink ray (November 5, 1950).

Literature
Cold War in a Country Garden (Lindsay Gutteridge, Pocket 1973) concerns the adventures of miniaturized spies.
Small World (Tabitha King, 1982) is about a dollhouse enthusiast who gains a device that will shrink anything, and takes it too far. 
The Atom, Ant-Man, The Wasp, and Doll Man are but a few of the comic book characters who had as a primary power the ability to shrink (usually by technological means).

Video games
Duke Nukem 3D and Duke Nukem Forever have a shrink gun capable of shrinking an enemy, which allows the player character Duke Nukem to step on the shrunken foe, instantly killing it. A similar weapon appears in Duke Nukem: Manhattan Project.
Engineers in World of Warcraft are capable of crafting a Gnomish shrink ray.
The Eiffel Tower is reduced in size, then stolen, in the game Evil Genius.
In the Men in Black game Crashdown, Agent Jay uses a shrink ray to shrink himself so he may fight a group of alien insects.
Pandemonium! features a shrink ray power-up.
Call of Duty: Black Ops Zombie mode includes weapon called 31-79JGb215, which reduces zombies size for short time so they can be instantly killed no matter of weapon, or even by running towards them, although this weapon is only seen in the map Shangri-La.
The game Ratchet & Clank: Size Matters features a shrink ray item, which Ratchet uses to enter keyholes and unlock them.

Other
The term "grocery shrink ray" has been used to describe a manufacturer decreasing the amount of product in a package while keeping the package price the same, as a scheme to implement a hidden price increase.

See also
 Raygun

References

Fictional energy weapons
Pseudoscience
Fiction about size change